HMS Hussar was a sixth-rate frigate of the Royal Navy, built in England in 1761–63. She was wrecked at New York in 1780.

In early 2013, a cannon from Hussar was discovered stored in a building in New York's Central Park still loaded with live gunpowder and shot.

Career

Hussar was commissioned in August 1763 under Captain James Smith, and sent for her commission cruising in the vicinity of Cape Clear. By 1767 she was commanded by Captain Hyde Parker. She continued to serve off North America between 1768 and 1771, before paying off into ordinary in March 1771. After being repaired and refitted at Woolwich from 1774 to 1777, she recommissioned in July 1777 under Captain Elliott Salter. In later life, she was part of the British fleet in North America. During the American Revolution, Hussar carried dispatches on the North American station.

Hussar captured the Spanish ship of the line Nuestra Señora del Buen Confeso (armed en flute), on 20 November 1779.

By mid-1780, the British position in New York was precarious as a French army had joined forces with General George Washington's troops north of the city.

Loss
When Admiral Sir George Brydges Rodney took his twenty ships of the line south in November, it was decided that the army's payroll be moved to the anchorage at Gardiners Bay on eastern Long Island. On 23 November 1780, against his pilot's better judgment, Hussars captain, Charles Pole, decided to sail from the East River through the treacherous waters of Hell Gate between Randall's Island and Astoria, Queens (on Long Island). Just before reaching Long Island Sound, Hussar was swept onto Pot Rock and began sinking. The minutes of the Royal Navy's court martial into the loss of the frigate (record held at the National Maritime Museum, Greenwich), make no mention of any payroll money or other special cargo aboard. The document appears to be little more than an administrative formality. It suggests that whatever valuables were aboard Hussar had been off-loaded by the time of her accident.

Salvage attempts
Although the British immediately denied there was any gold aboard the ship, and despite the difficulty of diving in the waters of Hell Gate, reports of $2 to $4 million in gold were the catalyst that prompted many salvage efforts over the next 150 years. Hussars remains, if any survive, are now believed to lie beneath landfill in the Bronx.

On 11 January 2013, preservationists with the Central Park Conservancy in New York were removing rust from a cannon from Hussar when they discovered it still contained gunpowder, wadding, and a cannonball. Police were called and bomb disposal staff eventually removed about 1.8 pounds of active black gunpowder from the cannon, which they disposed of at a gun range. "We silenced British cannon fire in 1776 and we don't want to hear it again in Central Park," the New York Police Department said in a statement.

In popular culture
In Kim Stanley Robinson's 2017 science fiction novel New York 2140, a sub-plot centers on an attempt to recover two chests with gold from the wreck of HMS Hussar that lies buried under a submerged parking lot in the former Bronx.

Citations and references
Citations

References

 Gardiner, Robert (1992) The First Frigates. (London: Conway Maritime Press). 
 
 Hu, Winnie. "Finding Trash and Worse, but So Far, No Sunken Treasure," New York Times, 4 Sep 2013, p. A17
 Lyon, David (1993) The Sailing Navy List (London: Conway Maritime Press). 
 Rattray. Perils of the Port of New York.

External links
 

 

Shipwrecks of the East River
Shipwrecks of the New York (state) coast
Maritime incidents in 1780
1763 ships
Sixth-rate frigates of the Royal Navy
Ships built in Rotherhithe